Grant Glacier may refer to the following glaciers in United States:

 Grant Glacier (Montana), in Flathead National Forest, Montana
 Grant Glacier (Washington), in Wenatchee National Forest, Washington